The Average Service Unavailability Index (ASUI) is a reliability index commonly used by electric power utilities. It is calculated as

ASUI can be represented in relation to SAIDI (where annual SAIDI is given in hours) as

References

Electric power distribution
Reliability indices